Halilu Obadaki (born 20 December 1993) is a Nigerian professional footballer who has played for Nigerian Premier League club Kwara United, El-Kanemi Warriors F.C. and presently with Crown F.C. for the 2017 Nigeria National League season

Career
Obadaki began his career with Karamone where he was discovered and trained. He made his professional debut with Kaduna United F.C. in 2007. He got two teams promotion in to the Nigeria Premier League from Nigeria National Pro-league Group A Winner with Kaduna United 2007/2008 and Nigeria National Pro-league Group A Runners-up with Ranchers Bees F.C. 2009/2010.

International career
Obadaki was a member of the Nigeria national under-20 team that qualified for the 2013 African U-20 Championship and 2013 FIFA U-20 World Cup.

References

External links
 
 

1993 births
Living people
Nigerian footballers
Kwara United F.C. players
Karamone F.C. players
Kaduna United F.C. players
Nigeria international footballers
Nigeria Professional Football League players
Association football defenders